The Brugse Belofte or Blindekens procession is a yearly Catholic parade held since 1304 in the Flemish city of Bruges (Brugge) on Assumption of Mary (15 August). In yearly remembrance of the safe homecoming of the craftsmen from the battle of Mons-en-Pévèle in 1304 against the French knights, a candle is brought by a procession to the church of Saint Mary of the Blinds.

Craftsmen of the richest region of Western Europe at that time did no longer bear the occupation by the French crown, represented by Governour Jacques de Châtillon. They could no longer bear social injustice, high taxes, occupation by foreigners, denial of sovereign rights, the French arrogance, ... King Edward I of England was in theory on their side, but he did nothing when Count of Flanders Guy of Dampierre was set to prison. Patricians on the other hand were on the side of the French King Philip IV.

So there were two double coalitions: French King and Flemish Patricians (rich) against Flemish Count and Flemish Craftsmen (poor). The latter started the Bruges Matins and won the battle of the Golden Spurs in 1302, but the former took revenge in 1304; Though the battle between a major French army facing the city milicias of Ghent, Kortrijk, Ypres, Bruges, Lille and Aalst did not conclusively point to a winner, the treaty of Athis-sur-Orge of 1305 resulted in a French dictate, containing the annexation of the cities of Lille, Douai and Béthune to France.

According to some sources, the vow to yearly offer an (expensive) 36 Flemish pound (15,5 kg) beeswax candle, was made by the women of the milicians, some sources mention it were the milicians themselves who were intensely praying for a safe retreat.

External links
 
 
History of Bruges
Parades in Belgium